Aristotelia epacria is a moth of the family Gelechiidae. It was described by John David Bradley in 1965 and is found in Uganda.

References

Moths described in 1965
Aristotelia (moth)
Moths of Africa